Alanine carboxypeptidase (N-benzoyl-L-alanine-amidohydrolase) is an enzyme. This enzyme catalyses the following chemical reaction

 Release of a C-terminal alanine from a peptide or a variety of pteroyl or acyl groups

This enzyme is isolated from soil bacteria. The enzyme from Corynebacterium equi also hydrolyses N-benzoylglycine and N-benzoyl-L-aminobutyric acid.

References

External links 
 

EC 3.4.17